Estes McLeod Banks (born December 18, 1945) is a former American football running back who played in the American Football League (AFL). Banks was an 8th round selection (188th overall pick) out of Colorado by the Oakland Raiders in the 1967 Common Draft. He played for the Raiders in 1967 and the Cincinnati Bengals in 1968.

See also
Other American Football League players

References

1945 births
Living people
Players of American football from Los Angeles
American football running backs
Colorado Buffaloes football players
Oakland Raiders players
Cincinnati Bengals players
American Football League players